; (March 21, 1838 – April 22, 1919) was a Japanese daimyō of the late Edo period. Held the title of Hyūga no Kami. Born the 8th son of Niwa Nagatomi, daimyō of Nihonmatsu (Mutsu Province; 100,000 koku), he was adopted by Mizuno Katsutō, the 14th generation daimyō of Yūki han (Shimōsa Province, 18,000 koku). He succeeded to the family headship in 1862. Katsutomo is known for his opposition to the new government during the Boshin War (1868–1869). Involved in the Battle of Utsunomiya, he nonetheless lost the war along with the northern forces, and was forced to retire and surrender 1,000 koku of his income.

Succeeded by his son Mizuno Katsuhiro, Katsutomo became a viscount in the new nobility.

Notes

External links
Data on the Mizuno house of Yūki

1838 births
1919 deaths
Meiji Restoration
Daimyo
Kazoku
Samurai
Mizuno clan